Gary Stefan (born June 23, 1959) is a retired ice hockey player and coach. He played for Richmond Flyers in 1980–1981 and Streatham Redskins between 1981 and 1987 before joining Slough Jets, whom he played for until he retired at the end of the 1998–99 season. He also played for the Great Britain national ice hockey team at three world championships in 1990, 1991 and 1992. He was inducted to the British Ice Hockey Hall of Fame in 2000.

Born in Brantford, Ontario, he is the older brother of ex-Detroit Red Wings goaltender Greg Stefan and Joe Stefan, who also played in the UK.

External links

British Ice Hockey Hall of Fame entry

1959 births
Living people
British Ice Hockey Hall of Fame inductees
British ice hockey players
Canadian ice hockey forwards
Ice hockey people from Ontario
Sportspeople from Brantford